Malaya Rata is the mountain areas of central Sri Lanka.

It is also one of the three historical regions of the island of Sri Lanka, with Rajarata and Ruhunurata. Malaya Rata was historically known to house the natives tribes; Yaksha, Raksha, and to a certain extent the Naga.

See also 
 Provinces of Sri Lanka
 History of Sri Lanka

References

Mountains of Sri Lanka